Budget Cuts is an independent virtual reality stealth game developed and published by Swedish studio Neat Corporation. The player is tasked with escaping an office building using a portal device, while evading enemies.

Gameplay 
Budget Cuts gives the player a portal gun, which allows the player to navigate their surroundings. This device, when activated, shoots a projectile in the direction it is facing, and allows the player to have a 360 degree view of where the projectile landed through a small and movable heads-up display that tracks to the device. The player can then teleport to the new location if desired.

A core mechanic of the game is throwing knives and scissors at enemies. These can be thrown, and will hit a target with the sharp point of the object. It is intentionally designed this way so that a good aim will always cause damage to the target.

Plot 
Budget Cuts is set in a company called "TransCorp," filled with human-like robotic office workers and security guards. There are no other people to be found, except for a voice over the phone, Winta. Winta informs the player that people have been disappearing, and the protagonist is the next target of an unspecified group. The player must escape the office buildings of TransCorp, while hiding from supervisors, walking security guards with guns.

Reception 

The game was received generally positive reviews, according to Metacritic. IGN writer Mitch Dyer said that "might be the best, most interesting VR game I’ve played."

References

Action video games
PlayStation 4 games
PlayStation VR games
Stealth video games
Teleportation in fiction
Video games developed in Sweden
Virtual reality games
Windows games
2018 video games
Valve Index games
HTC Vive games
Oculus Rift games